The grey-browed brushfinch (Arremon assimilis) is a species of bird in the family Passerellidae.

Taxonomy

The grey-browed brushfinch was often treated as a subspecies of the stripe-headed brushfinch (A. torquatus), but was determined a distinct species on the basis of differences in vocalization, plumage, and genetics.  The SACC split the group in 2010.

References

 

grey-browed brush finch
Birds of the Northern Andes
grey-browed brush finch